Indo may refer to:
 Indo-, a prefix indicating India or the Indian Subcontinent
 Indonesia, a country in Asia
 INDO LINES, callsign of Indonesian Airlines
 Indo people, people of mixed European and Indonesian ancestry
 Indo cuisine, fusion cuisine of Indonesian and European
 INDO, the Intermediate Neglect of Differential Overlap semi-empirical method
 Indo (apple), an apple cultivar
 Irish Independent, a newspaper commonly nicknamed 'The Indo'
 The slang term 'endo' or 'indo' is an AAVE prounuciation for "indoor"-grown marijuana.  
 Palacio de Indo, a former palace in Madrid

See also
 Endo (disambiguation)